Xenopsitta is a prehistoric parrot genus known from a fossil tarsometatarsus in early Miocene deposits at Merkur, in western Bohemia of the Czech Republic, and described by Jiri Mlikovsky in 1998.  The type species is Xenopsitta fejfari.  The generic name derives from the Greek for "foreign" or "strange", referring to the apparent scarcity of parrots in the Miocene of Europe, and a diminutive form of the Latin for "parrot".  The specific epithet honours Czech palaeontologist Oldrich Fejfar.  It was described as a small parrot with a short and robust tarsometatarsus resembling the tarsometatarsi of large African parrots in the genera Psittacus, Poicephalus and Coracopsis.

References

Psittacini
Bird genera
Parrots
Prehistoric birds of Europe
Fossil taxa described in 1998
Miocene birds